R&L or R+L may refer to:

 Relocation and linkage (R&L), an abbreviation in program development in computing
 Rhaegar + Lyanna = Jon, a fan theory regarding  the Jon Snow character in the "A Song of Ice and Fire"/"Game of Thrones" fantasy series
 R+L Carriers, an American freight shipping company
 RL circuit, an electrical circuit consisting of R and L components
 R&L Education (Rowman & Littlefield), a publishing house
 Rhett & Link, YouTube duo from Buies Creek, North Carolina